Jimy is a given name. It may refer to:

Jimy Heredia (born 1996), Peruvian beach volleyball player
Jimy Szymanski (born 1975), former tennis player
Jimy Williams (born 1943), American former professional baseball infielder
Jimy Hettes (born 1987), American mixed martial artist
Jimy Chambers, American drummer, member of Mercury Rev
Jimy Hoadley (born 1995), The American Master Porsche Technician